Markt Bibart is a market town and municipality in the district of Neustadt (Aisch)-Bad Windsheim in Bavaria in Germany.

Mayor
Klaus Nölp was elected in March 2014 the new mayor. He is the successor of Günther Ludwig.

References

Neustadt (Aisch)-Bad Windsheim